Zhdanivka or Zhdanovka is a city of regional significance in the Donetsk Oblast, Ukraine. The city is occupied by regular Russian and pro-Russian proxy forces since 2014.

History 
Starting Mid-April 2014 pro-Russian separatists captured several towns in Donetsk Oblast; including Zhdanivka. On 16 August 2014, Ukrainian forces reportedly secured the city from the pro-Russian separatists.

On 20 September 2014, Ukrainian troops left the city due to the threat of encirclement. Since then, it has remained under control of the so-called Donetsk People's Republic.

Demographics
As of the Ukrainian Census of 2001:

Ethnicity
 Ukrainians: 48.3%
 Russians: 47.4%
 Belarusians: 1.4%

 Language
Russian: 88.05%
Ukrainian: 10.94%
Armenian: 0.35%
Belarusian: 0.29%

References

Cities in Donetsk Oblast
Populated places established in the Ukrainian Soviet Socialist Republic
Cities of regional significance in Ukraine
Horlivka Raion